KWWK (96.5 FM, "Quick Country 96.5") is a radio station located in Rochester, Minnesota, with a country music format. It is under ownership of Townsquare Media.

On August 30, 2013, a deal was announced in which Townsquare would acquire 53 Cumulus Media stations, including KWWK, for $238 million. The deal was part of Cumulus' acquisition of Dial Global; Townsquare and Dial Global are both controlled by Oaktree Capital Management. The transaction was consummated effective November 14, 2013.

References

External links
Quick Country 96.5

Radio stations in Minnesota
Country radio stations in the United States
Townsquare Media radio stations